The 1997 Nottinghamshire County Council election was held on Thursday, 1 May 1997. The whole council was up for election and the result was the Labour Party retaining its control of the council.

This was the first County Council election not to include the City of Nottingham, which would become a unitary authority in 1998 and therefore no longer a part of the administrative county of Nottinghamshire. The boundaries of the electoral divisions remained the same however the loss of Nottingham meant that there were 25 fewer seats.

Election result

|}

References

1997
1997 English local elections
1990s in Nottinghamshire